DOS 20 may refer to IBM OS/2 versions:

 OS/2 2.0 ("DOS" version 20.00)
 OS/2 2.1 ("DOS" version 20.10)
 OS/2 Warp 3 ("DOS" version 20.30)
 OS/2 Warp 4 ("DOS" version 20.40)
 OS/2 Warp 4.5 ("DOS" version 20.45)

See also
 DOS (disambiguation)
 DOS 2 (disambiguation)
 DOS 10 (disambiguation)
 DOS 30